You Gave Me Freedom is the sixth album by Rosie Gaines, released on February 23, 2004.

Track listing
All tracks written by Rosie Gaines except where noted
 "I Can't Get You Off My Mind" – 4:03
 "Wanna Be" – 5:07
 "New Beginning" – 3:10
 "I'm a Woman" – 3:04
 "Give It to Me" – 4:02
 "Run to My Heart" – 3:52
 "In Spirit" – 6:45
 "It's Been a Long Time (You're on My Mind)" – 3:52
 "What the World Needs Now" – 3:46
 "Honeychild" – 5:01
 "My Man" – 4:37
 "Get Into the Groove" – 4:05
 "So in Love with You" – 5:01
 "You Are My Friend" – 4:41

Singles
"I Can't Get You Off My Mind"
"I Can't Get You Off My Mind" (Album Version) – 3:59
"Get Into the Groove" – 4:05
"I Can't Get You Off My Mind" (Long Version) – 7:43

"Run to My Heart"
Various remixes

External links
 Official You Gave Me Freedom album page

Rosie Gaines albums
2000 albums